The 1997 Super League season (also known as the Telstra Cup due to sponsorship by Telstra Corporation) was a breakaway professional rugby league football competition in Australia and the only one to be run by the News Limited-controlled Super League organisation. Eight teams which had broken away from the existing Australian Rugby League, in addition to the newly created Adelaide Rams and Hunter Mariners, competed over eighteen weekly rounds of the regular season. The top five teams then played a series of knock-out finals which culminated in a September grand final played in Brisbane between the Brisbane Broncos and Cronulla.

Background

Super League was a rugby league competition that was held in Australia in 1997. It was created by News Corporation after an unsuccessful attempt to purchase the pay television rights to Australian rugby league games. After two years of legal battles the competition was played for a single season in 1997 before merging with the rival Australian Rugby League competition in 1998 to form the National Rugby League.

Season summary
For this season video refereeing was introduced to rugby league for the first time. The Telstra Cup premiership was held over eighteen rounds. The season was dominated by the minor premiers, the Brisbane Broncos, who won 14 of their 18 matches, losing only to the Penrith Panthers, the Hunter Mariners and eventual runners-up, Cronulla. The Grand final was played at Brisbane's ANZ Stadium in front of 58,912 people; the ground record for that venue. Brisbane defeated Cronulla 26–8 to win their third* premiership. The Auckland Warriors had teams in the Reserve grade and two age-group grand finals but lost all three.

The grand finals:

  Brisbane Broncos vs  Cronulla Sharks (Seniors Grade)
  Canterbury Bulldogs vs  Auckland Warriors (Reserve Grade)
  Penrith Panthers vs  Auckland Warriors (Under-19s Grade)
  Brisbane Broncos vs  Auckland Warriors (Under-17s Grade)

The winners in all grades were:

  Brisbane Broncos (Seniors Grade)
  Canterbury Bulldogs (Reserve Grade)
  Penrith Panthers (Under-19s Grade)
  Brisbane Broncos (Under-17s Grade)

The Senior Grade and the Reserve Grade were called the Telstra Cup
The Under-19s Grade was called the Mal Meninga Cup
The Under-17s Grade was called the Terry Lamb Cup

At the end of the season, an Australian team was selected from the Telstra Cup Premiership's clubs to play in the Super League Test series against Great Britain in England.

The test matches

  Australia vs  New Zealand
  Australia vs  Great Britain
  New Zealand vs  Great Britain

The Super League Tri Series

  Queensland vs  New South Wales
  Queensland vs  New Zealand
  New South Wales vs  New Zealand

Teams
The ten Super League-aligned clubs contested the premiership, only three of which were based in Sydney (none of which were NSWRFL foundation clubs), compared to seven in the rival Australian Rugby League competition, which was run at the same time. A further team from greater New South Wales, two teams from Queensland, and one each from Australian Capital Territory, South Australia, Western Australia and Auckland in New Zealand made up the Super League competition. The Western Reds renamed themselves the Perth Reds for the Super League competition. The Bulldogs reinstated 'Canterbury' to their name (but not Bankstown).

Advertising
Teaser ads had been created by Mojo Sydney in 1996 around the theme of "Superleague: It's Coming". They featured Super League players performing superhuman feats. One notable execution included Canberra's Bradley Clyde inside a rodeo corral being stormed by a runaway bull with the suggestion that he is about to singlehandedly bring the bull to ground.

By season launch in 1997 Foxtel's ad agency Young and Rubicam Sydney had the Super League account and created a space-themed ad with players running through outer-space and the tag-line "Super League: It's out of this world".

Super League Television commercials featured the song Two Tribes by Frankie goes to Hollywood

By mid season the account had moved again and Sydney agency VCD produced much of the game promotional and club fixture print ads that ran in newspapers throughout the season. This commenced VCD's association with Super League that would continue with the ARL post the re-unification.

Ladder
(MP) - Minor Premiers
(P) - Premiers

Finals
Minor premiers Brisbane only played two finals games (including the grand final), both against Cronulla winning both convincingly.

Chart

Grand final
The Super League Grand final crowned a week of festivities, including a ball, street parade and massive game-night fireworks display, of the sort the Broncos' management had wanted the ARL to bring to Brisbane before the code's big schism in 1995. The game was on 20 September and despite stormy weather, a record crowd in Queensland rugby league history was at ANZ Stadium for the first ever night grand final and the first Australian top level grand final to be played outside Sydney. It attracted a ground record of 58,912 people, the biggest crowd for a grand final since 65,959 attended the drawn 1977 Sydney Rugby League grand final played at the Sydney Cricket Ground, and the largest to any sporting event in Brisbane since 52,000 attended the opening ceremony of the 1982 Commonwealth Games, also held at the venue, then known as the Queen Elizabeth II Stadium. Jon Stevens and Olivia Newton-John also performed in the pre-match entertainment.

The match was broadcast live by Australian Pay-TV channel Fox Sports with Greg Clark, Wally Lewis and Gary Freeman providing commentary, with Peter Jackson on the sideline. It was also broadcast on delay on the Nine Network with commentary provided by Ray Warren and  Peter Sterling.

The game was refereed by Bill Harrigan. The talented Brisbane side, featuring young up-and-coming stars in Darren Lockyer, Gorden Tallis and Shane Webcke overwhelmed a game Cronulla-Sutherland side. No points were scored until Lockyer's penalty kick in the eighth minute. In the twenty-second minute Mat Rogers equalised with another penalty kick. About three minutes later the next points came from yet another penalty kick by Lockyer, making the score 4–2 in favour of the home side. With just under seven minutes of the first half remaining, Allan Langer put a bomb up and into the Sharks left-hand corner which a leaping Rogers failed to secure and Steve Renouf picked up the ball and dived over for the first try of the match. Lockyer's conversion put the Broncos in front 10 - 2 which is what the score remained at for half-time.

Cronulla scored after less than four minutes of the second half when Wendell Sailor, returning the ball from a kick deep into his side's territory, passed the ball to nobody and it was chipped ahead by a Cronulla chaser and dived on by Russell Richardson. Mat Rogers converted the try successfully bringing the deficit back to two points at 10 - 8. In the fifty-fifth minute, The Broncos were on the attack and moved the ball out to the left for Renouf to score his second try of the match. Lockyer's kick, a metre in from the sideline was successful, making Brisbane's lead 16 - 8. About ten minutes later, Renouf scored close to the same spot, becoming only the third player in history to score a hat-trick in a grand final. Lockyer missed the kick so the Broncos lead 20 - 8 with fourteen minutes of the match remaining. An attempted field-goal kick by Lockyer in the seventy-eighth minute was charged down but Brisbane re-gathered the ball and one tackle later it was put through the hands out to the right wing, for replacement Michael Hancock to score the final try of the game. Lockyer kicked the extra two points with only seconds of the game remaining, so the final score was 26 - 8.

The win meant the Broncos were undefeated at ANZ Stadium all year and it kept the Broncos' 100% record intact in grand finals making it three from three, while the Sharks remained bridesmaids, at the time yet to score a grand final victory with zero from three. They would remain without a grand final win for another 20 years until their drought was finally broken in 2016.

Post game
A Super Bowl style match between the Brisbane Broncos and Newcastle Knights, the 1997 ARL season's premiers was mooted, but did not eventuate.

Post season

With twenty-two teams playing in two competitions in 1997 crowd attendances and corporate sponsorships were spread very thinly, and many teams found themselves in financial difficulty by the end of the season. Despite having the financial backing of Optus, the Australian Rugby League decided that it was not in the best interests of the game to run two competitions and undertook moves to approach News Limited and invite the traditional clubs back into the main competition. As a consequence of the negotiations that followed, on 23 September 1997 the ARL announced that it was forming a new competition in partnership with News Limited. The National Rugby League was formed from the ARL and Super League competitions.

It was announced that the 1998 season would have 20 teams competing, 19 of the ARL and Super League teams and the Melbourne Storm, who were owned by News Limited. Some of the clubs on both sides of the war were shut down. News decided to close the Hunter Mariners and the financially ruined Western/Perth Reds, who were $10million in debt at the end of 1997, while the ARL decided to close down the South Queensland Crushers, who were also in financial trouble. Additionally, at the end of the following season News Limited would decide to close down the Adelaide Rams and the ARL would close down the Gold Coast Chargers, even though they were one of the few clubs to make a profit during the Super League war.

See also
 1997 World Club Championship
 Brisbane Broncos 1997
 Super League Tri-series
 Super League (Australia)
 Super League War

References

External links
 Super League (Australia) season 1997 at rl1908.com
 Rugby League Tables - Notes The World of Rugby League
 Rugby League Tables - Season 1997 (SL) The World of Rugby League
 Premiership History and Statistics RL1908
Super League (Australia) season 1997 stats at rugbyleagueproject.com

Super League
National Rugby League seasons
Super League (Australia) season
Super League (Australia) season